Syca or Syce or Syke, also called Sycae or Sykai (Συκαί), possibly also called Setos, was a town of ancient Cilicia and later of Isauria, between Arsinoë and Celenderis. It became a bishopric; no longer the seat of a residential bishop, it remains a titular see of the Roman Catholic Church.

Syce is located near Softa Kalesi in Asiatic Turkey.

References

Populated places in ancient Cilicia
Populated places in ancient Isauria
Roman towns and cities in Turkey
Populated places of the Byzantine Empire
Catholic titular sees in Asia 
Former populated places in Turkey
History of Mersin Province